Typhlocyba is a genus of true bugs belonging to the family Cicadellidae.

Synonym: Typhlocypha Scudder, 1881

Species:
 Typhlocyba maderae
 Typhlocyba quercus

References

Cicadellidae
Hemiptera genera